Mompha lacteella is a moth in the family Momphidae found in Asia and Europe.

Dsscription
The wingspan is 11–13 mm. Adults are on wing from May to July.

The larvae feed on great willowherb (Epilobium hirsutum) and broad-leaved willowherb (Epilobium montanum), mining the leaves of their host plant. The mine consists of a large full depth blotch in the lower leaves. Most frass is deposited in coarse grains. The larva may leave the mine and restart elsewhere. Larvae can be found from March to April. They are yellowish pink to purple brown with a black head.

Pupation takes place inside the mine or in the ground.

Distribution
It is found in most of Europe, except the southern parts of the continent. In the east, the range extends through Asia Minor, the Caucasus, eastern Transcaucasia and southern Siberia to the Russian Far East.

References

External links
 Lepiforum e. V.

Momphidae
Leaf miners
Moths described in 1834
Moths of Asia
Moths of Europe
Taxa named by James Francis Stephens